Loretan is a surname. Notable people with the surname include: 

Brigitte Albrecht-Loretan (born 1970), Swiss cross-country skier
Erhard Loretan (1959–2011), Swiss mountain climber
Pascal Loretan (born 1989), Swiss sport shooter

See also
Loreta (given name)